Friedrich Gottlob Schulze (28 January 1795 – 3 July 1860) was a German economist.

Biography
He was born at Obergävernitz, near Meissen, and hence called Schulze-Gävernitz. He was educated at Leipzig and Jena, becoming professor in the latter university in 1821, and founding there an agricultural institute, the first connected with a German university. In 1832, he went to Greifswald, where he established a similar training school in Eldena in 1834. These institutions exercised great influence throughout Germany. In 1839 he returned to Jena, where a memorial to him was erected in 1867.

Schulze wrote Deutsche Blätter für Landwirtschaft und Nationalökonomie (1843–59), Nationalökonomie oder Volkswirtschaftslehre (1856), and the posthumous Lehrbuch der allgemeinen Landwirtschaft (1863).

References

Further reading
 Birnbaum, Schulze als Reformator der Landwirtschaftslehre (Schulze as a reformer of agricultural education; Frankfort, 1800)
 Biography by his son, Hermann (Heideldberg, 1888)

1795 births
1860 deaths
German economists
Leipzig University alumni
University of Jena alumni
Academic staff of the University of Jena
Academic staff of the University of Greifswald